Bjelland is a village in Lindesnes municipality in Agder county, Norway. The village was the administrative centre of the old municipality of Bjelland which existed from 1902 until 1964. The village is the site of Bjelland Church.

Notable people
Notable people that were born or lived in Bjelland include:
Beate Asserson (1913–2000), opera singer
Ole Høiland (1797–1848), well-known burglar and jail-breaker
Thore Torkildsen Foss (1841–1913), politician

References

Villages in Agder
Lindesnes